SpeedTouch is the brand name of a line of networking equipment produced by Alcatel and Technicolor SA. Before 27 January 2010 Technicolor was known as Thomson SA.

Under the SpeedTouch name Alcatel and Technicolor retail a variety of equipment including ADSL and ADSL2+ modems, residential gateways, wireless access equipment, VoIP handsets and SHDSL interconnect equipment. They are a major brand in home and business networking products.

Models
Following is a non-exhaustive list of existing SpeedTouch models:

Single-user modems
SpeedTouch Home
A modem which provides bridged and PPTP connections for Internet connectivity. The modem uses an Ethernet cable to connect to a PC, or may be connected to a router that supports PPPoE.

Speedtouch Pro
Same as the SpeedTouch Home, but with added Point-to-Point Protocol and basic NAT (Network Address Translation) functionality.

SpeedTouch USB and SpeedTouch 330
A basic ADSL USB modem, without router features and capable of speeds up to 1Mbit up and 7Mbit down. Due to its USB connection it requires drivers to work and is currently not supported well on Linux and not at all on intel-powered Macs or on Windows 95 and earlier.

SpeedTouch PC
A PCI extension card ADSL modem. This modem is more or less obsolete and has never been distributed in large numbers.

TG508
A single ethernet port ADSL2+ gateway with built in firewall.

Multi-user modems with built-in NAT router
ST510 1/4 ports /ST530(+USB)
Widely distributed ADSL modems with built in NAT router, firewall and UPnP. The ST510 is available with either 1 or 4 Ethernet ports. The ST530 only provides 1 Ethernet socket, but can also be connected through USB.

ST516
The first ADSL2+ modem in the SpeedTouch line-up. As with the ST510, this modem has a built in NAT router, firewall and UPnP. Firmware versions R5.3 and up also provide functionalities such as ALG (Application Layer Gateway) for VPN connections, remote management of the webinterface and Dynamic DNS. The middle number in the model number "5x6" indicates the number of Ethernet ports available on the modem. Firmware version 6.2.29.2 does not support PPTP (or GRE forwarding) when the ST516 is used in router mode.

ST536
A single ethernet and single USB port gateway with built in firewall.

ST546
A four ethernet port gateway with built in firewall.

TG605
A four ethernet port gateway with built in firewall designed for business use, VLAN support and remote management.

ST610 / ST610i / ST610s / ST610v
A line of business DSL routers launched in 2003, with optional IPSec and SIP support activated by software keys. Fixed WAN options are ADSL over POTS (ST610), ADSL over ISDN (ST610i), SHDSL (ST610s) and VDSL (ST610v). They are available either with a 4-port 10/100 LAN switch, or with an ATMF-25 LAN or WAN interface (except the 610v)

Wireless modems
TG185
A device that adds wireless transmission capabilities to an existing modem though an ethernet connection.

ST570
The first wireless modem in the SpeedTouch line. The ST570 features 802.11b wireless networking (11 Mbit/s) and can be secured using WEP and MAC filtering. The ST570 has 1 Ethernet port.

ST580
A more advanced wireless modem. The ST580 has 802.11g wireless networking and can be secured with WPA encryption.

TG582
The TG582 was introduced in 2010 and offers four ethernet ports and wireless, plus TR-691 capabilities for remote access and management.

ST585
Similar to the 580, but with added ADSL2+ support and better WPA encryption. Four ethernet ports and wireless antennae.  Widely distributed by Tiscali, O2, AOL and PlusNet in the UK. O2 rebrands this as "O2 Wireless Box II", and O2's BeThere subsidiary calls it the "BeBox".

TG587
A wireless modem designed for streaming multimedia content via 802.11n wireless. It includes four ethernet ports and a built-in firewall.

T576
Similar to the 585, but with only 1 Ethernet port. Also mainly distributed by AOL UK.

TG608
A wireless gateway with built in firewall designed for business use, VLAN support and remote management.

ST620
A four ethernet port gateway with wireless antennae and a built in firewall designed for business use.

TG670
A gateway aimed at business users with four ethernet ports and 802.11n wireless.

TG672
A gateway aimed at business users with four ethernet ports and 802.11n wireless. Similar to the TG670, but with multi-line DECT telephony, plus a gigabit LAN port for connection to a corporate network.

TG703
Four port ADSL2+ gateway with high-speed Internet access and video service together with telephony.

TG712
Four port ADSL2+ gateway with wireless.

ST780
ADSL2+ high-speed Internet access and video service together with telephony, wireless with WEP2, 4 Ethernet ports, 2 analog phone ports for internal sip client, 1 pstn connector.

TG782

TG784
A wireless modem designed for VoIP and Home Networking Connectivity by LAN, WAN and Wi-Fi. It includes five ethernet ports, a USB 2.0 master and a built-in firewall.

TG797
A wireless ADSL2+ modem designed for VoIP and Home Networking. It includes four ethernet ports, two USB 2.0 master, DECT and a built-in firewall.

TG870
A four ethernet port gateway with wireless antennae, integrated 3G Femto Access Point allowing 8 simultaneous users and a built in firewall designed for multimedia services over a residential network.

TG872
A four ethernet port gateway with wireless antennae, integrated 3G Femto Access Point allowing 8 simultaneous users and a built in firewall designed for multimedia services over a residential network. Allows remote management.

Criticism
SpeedTouch gateways have been criticized because the algorithm used by the manufacturer to set both the default SSID and the corresponding WEP/WPA-PSK/WPA2-PSK passwords was very easily compromised, meaning that wireless access to SpeedTouch models that still use the default password is easily possible.

In 2002 San Diego Supercomputer Center of the University of California reported their testing of Alcatel SpeedTouch devices that identified multiple security issues. They said:

References

External links

Networking hardware
Technicolor SA
Alcatel-Lucent